The Pedee Group is a geologic group in Kansas. It preserves fossils dating back to the Carboniferous period.

See also

 List of fossiliferous stratigraphic units in Kansas
 Paleontology in Kansas

References
 

Geologic groups of Kansas
Carboniferous System of North America